Sloupno is name of several Czech villages:
 Sloupno (Hradec Králové District)
 Sloupno (Havlíčkův Brod District)